The area of Tilleroyes is a small section of Besançon, France, which is located to the north of the city.

Toponymy 
The term "Tilleroyes" is formed from the word for lime plus the oye suffix that means a collection of plants. There was thus likely a forest of lime trees in the area.

Education 
 Jean Boichard public kindergarten 
 Jean Boichard elementary school
 School nurses

Buildings 
 Sports Center 
 Castle Stables Galland 
 Clinique Saint Vincent 
 Sanatorium
 Castle Galland

References and sources 
 French page about Tilleroyes

Tilleroyes